Richard N. Komi is an American immigrant from Nigeria who served in the New Hampshire House of Representatives as a member of the Democratic Party.

Life

Komi claims to have faced political persecution as a member of the Ogoni people in Nigeria. After he spent time in a refugee camp in Benin, he was brought to Manchester, New Hampshire on September 13, 1999.

Career

Komi served as a member of the New Hampshire House of Representatives where he represented the Hillsborough 43 district from 2008 to 2010. On November 6, 2018, Komi was again elected to the New Hampshire House of Representatives where he represented the same district.

Controversy 
Komi faced calls for resignation in early May 2020 after claiming that the female anatomy made Tara Reade's sexual assault claim impossible without "cooperation" from Reade. He apologized for the statement and insisted that Reade's accusation was false. He resigned from office on May 2, 2020.

References

21st-century American politicians
African-American state legislators in New Hampshire
American people of Nigerian descent
American politicians of Nigerian descent
Living people
Democratic Party members of the New Hampshire House of Representatives
Nigerian emigrants to the United States
Ogoni people
Politicians from Manchester, New Hampshire
Year of birth missing (living people)
21st-century African-American politicians